The  2012 Edmonton Indy was the eleventh round of the 2012 IndyCar Series season.  the final Edmonton Indy It took place on Sunday, July 22, 2012. The race was contested over 75 laps at the  temporary airport course at  Edmonton City Centre Airport in Edmonton, Alberta, Canada.

Classification

Starting grid

Race results

Notes
 Points include 1 point for pole position and 2 points for most laps led.

Standings after the race

Drivers' Championship

Manufacturers' Championship

Note: Only the top five positions are included for the driver standings.

References

External links

2012
2012 in IndyCar
2012 in Canadian motorsport
2012 in Alberta
July 2012 sports events in Canada